Mikael Bassalé, I.C.P.B. (born 16 January 1969) is a Lebanese-born Armenian Catholic clergyman. He is serving as an Apostolic Administrator of the Ordinariate for Catholics of Armenian Rite in Eastern Europe from 17 May 2022.

Life
Father Bassalé was born in a diasporan Armenian family in Beirut on 16 January 1969. After completed his primary education in Aleppo, he subsequently joined the Minor Seminary of the Patriarchal Congregation of Bzommar in Aleppo, where studied during 1986−1987, and continued his studies at the Major Bzommarian Seminary in Lebanon, where he made a solemn profession. He was ordained as priest on 21 December 1997, after the postgraduate studies in the Pontifical Gregorian University in Rome, Italy.

After his ordination to priesthood, he served in the different Bzommar institutions in Lebanon, Armenia, Georgia and Russia and in the same time made a pastoral work for the Armenian Catholics. Last years Fr. Bassalé served as a parish priest of the Holy Cross in Belmont, Massachusetts, in the United States of America.

On 17 May 2022 Father Bassalé was appointed by Pope Francis an Apostolic Administrator of the Ordinariate for Catholics of Armenian Rite in Eastern Europe, that remained vacant almost 9 months, when the previous ordinary Raphaël François Minassian was elected as the Catholicos-Patriarch of Cilicia.

References

1969 births
Living people
People from Beirut
Members of the Patriarchal Congregation of Bzommar
Lebanese people of Armenian descent
Pontifical Gregorian University alumni